Clatskanie  is a city in Columbia County, Oregon, United States. It was named for the Tlatskanai Native American tribe, and the Clatskanie River which flows through the town and empties into the Columbia River about four miles to the north. The population was 1,737 at the 2010 census.

History
The town was originally called Bryantville after the large family who were among the first filers of Donation Land Claims in the area in 1852-53. However, the first postmaster, Enoch Conyers, who was married to one of the Bryant daughters, changed the name to Clatskanie after the Tlatskanai Native American tribe.

According to the Clatsop County pioneer Silas B. Smith, Tlatskanai was a point in the Nehalem River that was reached from the Columbia River by way of the Youngs River or by way of the Clatskanie River. The native inhabitants, who were not in the habit of naming streams, did not use the word Tlatskanai for the streams they would follow in order to get to that point, but the white men who settled here later did apply the name to the streams.

Many of Clatskanie's inhabitants are of Nordic heritage, specifically Finnish, Swedish, and Norwegian.

Geography

Climate
According to the Köppen Climate Classification system, Clatskanie has a warm-summer Mediterranean climate, abbreviated "Csb" on climate maps.

Demographics

2010 census
As of the census of 2010, there were 1,737 people, 729 households, and 469 families living in the city. The racial makeup of the city was 92.9% White, 0.4% African American, 2.0% Native American, 0.5% Asian, 0.1% Pacific Islander, 0.9% from other races, and 3.3% from two or more races. Hispanic or Latino of any race were 3.7% of the population.

There were 729 households, of which 32.4% had children under the age of 18 living with them, 46.8% were married couples living together, 12.1% had a female householder with no husband present, 5.5% had a male householder with no wife present, and 35.7% were non-families. 30.9% of all households were made up of individuals, and 16.3% had someone living alone who was 65 years of age or older. The average household size was 2.36 and the average family size was 2.91.

The median age in the city was 38.9 years. 24.8% of residents were under the age of 18; 8.6% were between the ages of 18 and 24; 22.6% were from 25 to 44; 27.8% were from 45 to 64; and 16.1% were 65 years of age or older. The gender makeup of the city was 47.8% male and 52.2% female.

2000 census
As of the census of 2000, there were 1,528 people, 608 households, and 406 families living in the city. The population density was 1,274.1 people per square mile (491.6/km2). There were 659 housing units at an average density of 549.5 per square mile (212.0/km2). The racial makeup of the city was 93.91% White, 0.07% African American, 1.24% Native American, 0.65% Asian, 0.26% Pacific Islander, 1.05% from other races, and 2.81% from two or more races. Hispanic or Latino of any race were 3.34% of the population. 22.6% were of German, 10.3% Norwegian, 9.4% Finnish, 9.1% Irish, 8.2% English and 6.8% American ancestry according to Census 2000. 94.0% spoke English, 4.1% Spanish and 1.6% Finnish as their first language.

There were 608 households, out of which 35.0% had children under the age of 18 living with them, 51.6% were married couples living together, 12.7% had a female householder with no husband present, and 33.1% were non-families. 27.8% of all households were made up of individuals, and 15.3% had someone living alone who was 65 years of age or older. The average household size was 2.47 and the average family size was 3.07.

In the city, the population was spread out, with 29.6% under the age of 18, 7.3% from 18 to 24, 26.0% from 25 to 44, 21.0% from 45 to 64, and 16.0% who were 65 years of age or older. The median age was 36 years. For every 100 females, there were 90.5 males. For every 100 females age 18 and over, there were 81.3 males.

The median income for a household in the city was $35,833, and the median income for a family was $48,056. Males had a median income of $41,550 versus $24,286 for females. The per capita income for the city was $16,717. About 11.1% of families and 11.5% of the population were below the poverty line, including 11.4% of those under age 18 and 12.1% of those age 65 or over.

Education
Clatskanie is served by the two public schools of Clatskanie School District, namely the combined Clatskanie Middle/High School, and Clatskanie Elementary School, as well as Piercing Arrow Private School.

Politics

Clatskanie has generally voted Republican in recent years in presidential elections, with the notable exception being Barack Obama in 2008.

Notable people

Raymond Carver (1938–1988), short story writer and poet
Cole Escola (1986–), comedian and actor
Harvey Karman (1924–2008), psychologist and abortion rights activist
Merlin F. Schneider (1901-1970), Brigadier General, USMC, recipient of the Navy Cross.

See also
 Thomas J. Flippin House
 The Chief (Oregon newspaper), a paper long based in Clatskanie, founded in 1891

References

External links

 Entry for Clatskanie in the Oregon Blue Book
 The Clatskanie Chief Newspaper

Cities in Oregon
Cities in Columbia County, Oregon
1871 establishments in Oregon
Populated places established in 1871
de:Clatskanie